Sabela is a dialect of several major South African languages used primarily in South Africa. Sabela was originally developed inside national prisons as a means of communication within gangs, primarily The Numbers Gang. Since then, released inmates have brought the language out to the general populace of South Africa.

ukuSabela means to respond in various nguni languages

Structure
Sabela inherits most of its vocabulary, phonology, and syntax from Afrikaans, English, Xhosa, and Zulu. Due to the Xhosa and Zulu influence, Sabela contains click consonants.

Words in Sabela

In popular culture

Die Antwoord
Sabela is often used by groups associated with the Zef movement, such as Die Antwoord. The group's 2019 single "Baita Jou Sabela" (featuring Slagysta) contains lyrics partially written in Sabela that talk about the South African prison system. The song's music video is set in a prison and showcases the corruption present in the South African prison system.

References

External links 
 Music Video of Die Antwoord's "Baita Jou Sabela" (featuring Slagysta)

Languages of South Africa
Prisons